Bolinas Ridge is a north-south ridge in southwestern Marin County, California.
 Much of the western side of the ridge is protected parkland in the Golden Gate National Recreation Area, and the eastern side is watershed lands of the Marin Municipal Water District.



The setting

The ridge parallels a section of the San Andreas Fault, and features panoramic vistas with trees, meadows, rounded hillsides, Bolinas Lagoon, Tomales Bay, the Olema Valley and the Pacific Ocean.
West Ridgecrest Road, a two lane highway, runs along the southern portion of the ridge, and has been the location for numerous automobile commercial video shoots. This roadway begins at the Rock Spring parking area and heads north along the ridge. Views to the east include lakes and undulating hills, with the ocean to the west, the source of dense fog that sometimes obscures all views and limits visibility to a few feet.

Flora
Much of the original old-growth Coast redwoods were logged off in the late 1800s and shipped out by way of Bolinas Lagoon; however, new redwoods have grown again in the years since, providing a second-growth forest in patches.

Today, a diverse community of plant life grows along the ridge. Along with the tall redwoods, sections include stands of Douglas fir, various mixed scrub and open grassland hillsides, hardwood woodlands and along the lower slopes, maritime chaparral that features rare Marin Manzanita (Arctostaphylos virgata) and a federally designated 'Species of Concern', Mason's ceanothus (Ceanothus masonii), listed by the state of California as rare.

See also
Bolinas, California
Audubon Canyon
Copper Mine Gulch
McKinnan Gulch
Morses Gulch
Pike County Gulch
Stinson Gulch
Wilkins Gulch

References

Landforms of Marin County, California
West Marin
Ridges of California
Bay Area Ridge Trail